City Streets may refer to:

City Streets (1931 film), a 1931 film starring Gary Cooper
City Streets (1938 film), a 1938 film starring Leo Carrillo and Edith Fellows
City Streets (album), a 1989 album by Carole King
The City Streets, a band from Edmonton, Alberta, Canada